The Hamptons, Long Island AVA is an American Viticultural Area located entirely within eastern Suffolk County, New York, and includes the entire South Fork of Long Island and the townships of Southampton and East Hampton. Authored by winemaker Richard Olsen-Harbich in 1984, it was the first AVA to be approved for Long Island. The local climate is heavily influenced by the nearby Atlantic Ocean and Peconic Bay. The region is generally cooler and more prone to fog than the nearby North Fork of Long Island AVA. The soil is silt and loam. The area is in hardiness zone 7a except for Montauk where it is 7b.

References 

American Viticultural Areas
New York (state) wine
Geography of Suffolk County, New York
1988 establishments in New York (state)